Titus is a fictional character appearing in American comic books published by Marvel Comics.

Publication history
Titus first appeared in Nova Vol. 5 #1 and was created by Jeph Loeb and Ed McGuinness.

Fictional character biography
Titus is an unnamed white tiger alien who was a member of the Supernovas, a black ops branch of the Nova Corps. He served with Jesse Alexander (the father of Sam Alexander), Mister Z'zz, The Phlish, and a few other Supernovas.

Following the desertion of Jesse Alexander, Titus was attacked by the Chitauri which led to the loss of Titus' right eye and arm causing him to replace his missing parts with cybernetics. After serving the Chitauri for several years, Titus came to Earth in search of Jesse Alexander's Nova helmet.

Titus lies to Sam Alexander telling him that he had killed his father. This is not true because Jesse Alexander is being held captive by the Chitauri. When Titus finds Sam, he threatens not only him, but everything he holds dearly to him in exchange for the Ultimate Nullifier he stole from their ship. Sam then gets back his helmet from Titus and takes them both to outer space, expecting the lack of oxygen to kill Titus. When that plan fails, Sam takes out the Ultimate Nullifier and tells Titus to take his forces and leave. Titus and Sam then struggle for the Ultimate Nullifier and Sam accidentally triggers it killing Titus and an entire fleet of Chitauri.

Titus somehow turned up alive when he and Death's Head ambush Sam and Richard Rider in Knowhere.

Powers and abilities
As part of the Nova Corps, Titus wields a Nova Gun and can breathe in outer space.

In other media

Television
 Titus appears in Ultimate Spider-Man, voiced by JB Blanc. This version was a member of the Nova Corps until he betrayed the organization and formed an alliance with the Chitauri. In the episode "Return of the Guardians of the Galaxy", Titus discovered a Nova helmet on Earth and attempts to retrieve it, only to be defeated by Sam Alexander, Spider-Man, and the Guardians of the Galaxy. In "Contest of Champions" Pt. 4, the Grandmaster has Titus, Doctor Octopus, Absorbing Man, and the Executioner fight Spider-Man, Captain America, and Hawkeye.
 Titus appears in Guardians of the Galaxy, voiced again by JB Blanc. This version joined the Nova Corps to become involved in the intergalactic black market. Following a minor appearance in the episode "Origins", Titus appears in the episode "Take the Milano and Run" when the Guardians of the Galaxy encounter him on the space station Conjunction. Titus and the Nova Corpsmen with him attempt to arrest the Guardians, but they defeat him before leaving Conjunction. In the episode "Can't Fight This Seedling", Titus pursues the Guardians, but ends up crash-landing on a nearby planet and contacts his superiors to request the use of an anti-matter missile. Though they deny him, he attempts to use it anyway, only for Drax the Destroyer to redirect it into an asteroid. Titus later tries to arrest the Guardians again, but is stopped by the alien locals. In the episode "Undercover Angle", Titus catches the Guardians while they are infiltrating the Nova Corps's headquarters, but chooses not to arrest them in exchange for them infiltrating the Black Order, ostensibly to keep them from finding Ronan the Accuser's Universal Weapon. Amidst the Guardians and Black Order's fight over the weapon, Titus attacks both groups to claim it for himself and give it to the Collector, forcing the two groups to temporarily work together to stop Titus. During the fight, Star-Lord records Titus confessing his true motives for joining the Nova Corps and sends it to his superiors. While he defeats the Black Order, Titus is defeated by the Guardians in turn and arrested by the Nova Corps, vowing revenge. In the episode "Rock Your Baby", a rogue Nova Centurion helmet enables Titus to escape his imprisonment and pursue vengeance against the Guardians. After tracking them down, he attempts to convince Adam Warlock to destroy the Guardians, but Warlock traps Titus in his gem. Titus also makes a minor appearance in the episode "You Do Not Always Get What You Want" as one of several prisoners in Warlock's gem.

Video games
Titus appears in Marvel: Avengers Alliance 2.

References

External links
 Titus at Marvel Wiki
 Titus at Comic Vine

Comics characters introduced in 2013
Fictional tigers
Marvel Comics aliens
Marvel Comics extraterrestrial supervillains
Marvel Comics supervillains
Characters created by Jeph Loeb